Young Muslims Canada is an Islamic organization working among the Muslim youth of Canada. Formed in 1994, Young Muslims Canada is one of the largest Muslim youth groups in Canada.

Young Muslims Canada offers educational, developmental, and recreational activities for Muslim youth.

References 

Islamic youth organizations
Islamic organizations based in Canada
Youth organizations based in Canada
1994 establishments in Canada
Islamic organizations established in 1994
Youth organizations established in 1994